The Chemtou Museum is an archaeological museum located in Chemtou, Tunisia. The museum was designed by archaeologists with the Tunisian National Heritage Institute and the German Archaeological Institute with offices located in Rome, Italy. It has the distinction of being located in the area of the old Roman city of Simmithu, near the entrepot's marble quarry in what was the ancient Berber kingdom of Numidia.

Marble quarries

A series of Roman mill races to horizontal water turbines have also been discovered. This indicates that technologically, part of the activities at the site had been mechanised.

See also

Culture of Tunisia
List of archaeological sites by continent and age
List of archaeological sites by country
List of museums in Tunisia

References

Aïcha Ben Abed, Carthage. Capitale de l'Africa, Connaissance des arts, hors-série Carthage n°69, 1995, p. 28.

External links
chimtou.com, museum's official website
Musée de Chemtou at l'Institut national du patrimoine (in French)

Museums with year of establishment missing
Archaeological museums in Tunisia
Numidia
Marble
Jendouba Governorate